Jan Roland Andersson (born 14 December 1950 in Uppsala) is a Swedish former Olympic sailor in the Soling class. He finished 8th in the Soling class the 1980 Summer Olympics together with Bertil Larsson and Göran Andersson.

External links

Olympic sailors of Sweden
Swedish male sailors (sport)
Sailors at the 1980 Summer Olympics – Soling
1950 births
Living people
Ekolns Segelklubb sailors
Sportspeople from Uppsala
20th-century Swedish people